GloToven is the first in a series of collaborative mixtapes by American rapper Chief Keef and American producer Zaytoven. It was released on March 15, 2019, through Glo Gang and RBC Records. It follows Chief Keef's The Leek Vol. 7 mixtape and Zaytoven's 2018 album with Usher, A. The mixtape was preceded by the single "Spy Kid".

Background
Zaytoven called GloToven "one of my favorite albums because it challenges me to produce with youthful, unorthodox creativity"; The Fader in turn called the lead single "Spy Kid" "effortless". Upon announcement of the project, HotNewHipHop called the two an "unlikely duo".

Track listing

References

2019 albums
Chief Keef albums
Zaytoven albums